Pooja Ghatkar (born 1989) is an Indian professional sports shooter. She competes in the women's 10 meter air rifle event.

Career
Ghatkar competed in the senior National Championships in 2013 in Delhi in the 10 meter air rifle event and won a gold medal. She won gold the following year at the Asian Championships in 2014 in Kuwait City. She scored 413.1 in the qualification round and 208.8 in the final to beat China's  Du Bej's 207.2. 

Competing at the Asian Olympic Qualifying Tournament in New Delhi to qualify for the 2016 Rio Olympics, a hit of 8.8 in the final cost her the spot after she lost it to fellow Indian Ayonika Paul, and won the bronze. Her first major international win came in 2017 when she won bronze at the 2017 New Delhi World Cup. She entered the final placed second having scored 418.0 in the qualification rounds. In the final, she managed 228.8. after falling behind China's Dong Lijie midway.

References

External links
 Pooja Ghatkar profile at International Shooting Sport Federation

Living people
1989 births
Sport shooters from Pune
Indian female sport shooters
ISSF rifle shooters
Sportswomen from Maharashtra